Moot may refer to:

 Mootness, in American law: a point where further proceedings have lost practical significance; whereas in British law: the issue remains debatable
 Moot court, an activity in many law schools where participants take part in simulated court proceedings
 moot, the pseudonym for Christopher Poole (born c. 1988), founder of the anonymous imageboard 4chan.org

See also
 Meeting (Old English (Anglo-Saxon): Moot)
 Folkmoot
 Jamtamót, the old assembly of Jämtland
 Witenagemot, the High Council of Anglo-Saxon England
 Moot hall, a meeting or assembly building, traditionally to decide local issues
 Moot hill, a hill or mound historically used as an assembly or meeting place
 World Scout Moot, a gathering of older Scouts, mainly Rover Scouts, ages 18–26 from all over the world
 Entmoot, a gathering of Ents in The Lord of the Rings
 MoodleMoot, a gathering or conference relating to the Moodle Learning Management System